Els Alamús is a town situated in the comarca of Segrià in Lleida, Catalonia, Spain. Its population is 799 inhabitants.

References

External links
City council site
 Government data pages 

Municipalities in Segrià
Populated places in Segrià